Frenchtown, California may refer to:
 Frenchtown, El Dorado County, California
 Frenchtown, Yuba County, California